St Ann's Hospice is a charity in Greater Manchester, England, providing palliative care.

It was established in 1971 on the initiative of Dr Moya Cole from the Christie Hospital, Manchester.  It now runs three centres: the Neil Cliffe Centre at University Hospital of South Manchester NHS Foundation Trust, St Ann's Hospice Heald Green, and St Ann's Hospice, Little Hulton.

Like most hospices in the UK, it is largely funded by voluntary donations. About a third of its funding is provided by the NHS, so has to raise around £20,000 a day to keep the hospices open.

The organisation abandoned national NHS payscales in 2014 and set up its own.

References

External links
St Ann's Hospice
The Neil Cliffe Centre

Hospices in England
Health in Greater Manchester
1971 establishments in England